Eastern Rukum 1 is the parliamentary constituency of Eastern Rukum District in Nepal. This constituency came into existence on the Constituency Delimitation Commission (CDC) report submitted on 31 August 2017.

Incorporated areas 
Eastern Rukum 1 incorporates the entirety of Eastern Rukum District.

Assembly segments 
It encompasses the following Lumbini Provincial Assembly segment

 Eastern Rukum 1(A)
 Eastern Rukum 1(B)

Members of Parliament

Parliament/Constituent Assembly

Provincial Assembly

1(A)

1(B)

Election results

Election in the 2020s

2022 general election

Election in the 2010s

2017 legislative elections

2017 Nepalese provincial elections

1(A)

1(B)

See also 

 List of parliamentary constituencies of Nepal

References

External links 

 Constituency map of Eastern Rukum

Parliamentary constituencies of Nepal